Smriti Vidyarthi is a Kenyan news anchor and reporter, host of NTV Wild Talk at 10.00 PM EA Time at the Kenyan NTV.

She is the granddaughter of journalist Girdhari Lal Vidyarthi.

References

External links

Living people
Alumni of the University of Warwick
Alumni of City, University of London
Kenyan journalists
Kenyan people of Indian descent
Year of birth missing (living people)